The 2005 Wallabies spring tour  was a series of five matches played by the Australia national rugby union team in November 2005.

Matches

French Barbarians

France 
George Gregan played his 115th test match, beating the world record of Jason Robinson

France: 15. Julien Laharrague, 14. Aurélien Rougerie, 13. Florian Fritz, 12. Yannick Jauzion, 11. Cédric Heymans, 10. Frédéric Michalak, 9. Jean-Baptiste Élissalde, 8. Thomas Lièvremont, 7. Rémy Martin, 6. Yannick Nyanga, 5. Jérôme Thion, 4. Fabien Pelous (c), 3. Pieter de Villiers, 2. Dimitri Szarzewski, 1. Olivier Milloud, – Replacements: 16. Sébastien Bruno, 17. Sylvain Marconnet, 18. Lionel Nallet, 19. Grégory Lamboley, 20. Sébastien Chabal, 21. Yann Delaigue, 22. Thomas Castaignède 
Australia: 15. Chris Latham, 14. Wendell Sailor, 13. Lote Tuqiri, 12. Morgan Turinui, 11. Mat Rogers, 10. Matt Giteau, 9. George Gregan (c), 8. George Smith, 7. Phil Waugh, 6. Rocky Elsom, 5. Nathan Sharpe, 4. Mark Chisholm, 3. Al Baxter, 2. Brendan Cannon, 1. Matt Dunning, – Replacements: 16. Stephen Moore, 17. Greg Holmes, 18. Hugh McMeniman, 19. John Roe, 20. Chris Whitaker, 21. Lloyd Johansson, 22. Drew Mitchell

England
Wallabies lost this match, the same scoreline against France a week earlier. The man of the match was Andrew Sheridan. For the Wallabies the situation was dire, with Eddie Jones facing removal as head coach.

England: 15. Josh Lewsey, 14. Mark Cueto, 13. Jamie Noon, 12. Mike Tindall, 11. Ben Cohen, 10. Charlie Hodgson, 9. Matt Dawson, 8. Martin Corry (c), 7. Lewis Moody , 6. Pat Sanderson, 5. Danny Grewcock, 4. Steve Borthwick, 3. Phil Vickery, 2. Steve Thompson, 1. Andrew Sheridan, – Replacements: 21. Olly Barkley, 22. Mark van Gisbergen – Unused: 16. Lee Mears, 17. Matt Stevens, 18. Louis Deacon, 19. Chris Jones, 20. Harry Ellis
Australia: 15. Chris Latham, 14. Mark Gerrard, 13. Lote Tuqiri, 12. Morgan Turinui, 11. Drew Mitchell, 10. Mat Rogers, 9. George Gregan (c) , 8. George Smith, 7. Phil Waugh, 6. John Roe, 5. Nathan Sharpe, 4. Hugh McMeniman, 3. Al Baxter , 2. Brendan Cannon, 1. Matt Dunning, – Replacements: 16. Tatafu Polota-Nau, 17. Greg Holmes, 18. Mark Chisholm, 19. Scott Fava, 20. Chris Whitaker, 21. Matt Giteau, 22. Lloyd Johansson

Ireland
This was the only test match won by the Wallabies. The match was played in Lansdowne Road, with reduced capacity to 42,000 after a fire.

Ireland: 15. Geordan Murphy, 14. Shane Horgan, 13. Andrew Trimble, 12. Gordon D'Arcy, 11. Tommy Bowe, 10. Ronan O'Gara, 9. Peter Stringer, 8. Denis Leamy, 7. Johnny O'Connor, 6. Simon Easterby (c), 5. Malcolm O'Kelly, 4. Donncha O'Callaghan, 3. John Hayes, 2. Shane Byrne, 1. Marcus Horan, – Replacements: 16. Rory Best, 17. Simon Best, 18. Matt McCullough, 19. Neil Best, 20. Kieran Campbell, 21. David Humphreys, 22. Girvan Dempsey 
Australia: 15. Chris Latham, 14. Mark Gerrard, 13. Lote Tuqiri, 12. Morgan Turinui, 11. Drew Mitchell, 10. Mat Rogers, 9. George Gregan (c), 8. George Smith , 7. Phil Waugh, 6. John Roe, 5. Nathan Sharpe, 4. Hugh McMeniman, 3. David Fitter, 2. Brendan Cannon, 1. Greg Holmes, – Replacements: 16. Tatafu Polota-Nau, 17. Al Baxter, 18. Mark Chisholm, 19. Scott Fava, 20. Matt Henjak, 21. Lloyd Johansson, 22. Wendell Sailor

Wales
After the victory against Ireland, the Wallabies crashed to a low with a close loss to Wales.

The day after the game, Eddie Jones was axed due to poor results.

Wales: 15. Gareth Thomas (c), 14. Dafydd James, 13. Matthew Watkins, 12. Sonny Parker, 11. Shane Williams, 10. Stephen Jones, 9. Gareth Cooper, 8. Michael Owen, 7. Martyn Williams, 6. Colin Charvis, 5. Robert Sidoli, 4. Ian Gough, 3. Chris Horsman, 2. T.Rhys Thomas, 1. Duncan Jones, – Replacements: 16. Mefin Davies, 17. Adam R. Jones, 21. Ceri Sweeney – Unused: 18. Ian Evans, 19. Jonathan Thomas, 20. Mike Phillips, 22. Lee Byrne
Australia: 15. Chris Latham, 14. Mark Gerrard, 13. Lote Tuqiri, 12. Morgan Turinui, 11. Drew Mitchell, 10. Mat Rogers, 9. George Gregan (c), 8. George Smith, 7. Phil Waugh, 6. John Roe, 5. Nathan Sharpe, 4. Hugh McMeniman, 3. David Fitter, 2. Brendan Cannon, 1. Matt Dunning, – Replacements: 17. Al Baxter, 18. Mark Chisholm, 20. Chris Whitaker, 22. Wendell Sailor – Unused: 16. Tatafu Polota-Nau, 19. Scott Fava, 21. Lloyd Johansson

References

2005
2005
2005
2005
2005
2005–06 in European rugby union
2005 in Australian rugby union
2005–06 in Irish rugby union
2005–06 in English rugby union
2005–06 in Welsh rugby union
2005–06 in French rugby union
November 2005 sports events in France
November 2005 sports events in the United Kingdom